The lateral inguinal fossa is a structure described in human anatomy. It is a shallow concave stretch of peritoneum on the deep surface of the anterior abdominal wall and is best seen from the greater peritoneal cavity, looking anteriorly (as, for example, during laparoscopy).

Boundaries
It is a shallow depression on the inner aspect of the abdominal wall lateral to the lateral umbilical fold.

Clinical significance
It is a site of herniation for indirect inguinal hernia.

See also
 Medial inguinal fossa

External links
  - "Internal surface of the anterior abdominal wall."

Abdomen